Amelia Reynolds is an actress from New Zealand.

Career
Amelia Reynolds is best known for her role as Tally in The Tribe. She is also known for her roles in the children's television productions. Reynolds played Chloe, a sea ghost, in Paradise Café and played Lara in the Disney Channel's As The Bell Rings. She is a student at Victoria University of Wellington, and has performed in theatrical productions in the city, including Counting The Ways by Edward Albee.

Filmography

Film

Television

References

External links
 

New Zealand television actresses
Year of birth missing (living people)
Living people